Jean Pierre Charles Perrot de Renneville was a French playwright in the 1800s.

A commissioner-inspector of the Théâtres et Spectacles de Paris, his plays were presented on the most important Parisian stages of his time, including the Théâtre des Folies-Dramatiques, the Théâtre de l'Ambigu-Comique, and the Théâtre de l'Opéra.

Works 
1837: Le Chemin de fer de Saint-Germain, one-act à-propos-vaudeville, with Henri de Tully and Adolphe Salvat
1845: L'Agent matrimonial, one-act vaudeville, with Salvat
1847: Un Chapitre de Balzac, two-act comédie en vaudevilles
1849: La Filleule des fées, grand ballet-féerie in 3 acts and 7 tableaux, preceded by a prologue
1853: Page et pensionnaire, one-act vaudeville, with Eugène Nantulle
1855: Hardi comme un page, two-act vaudeville
1858: Le Quinze août, ou le Rêve d'un soldat, à-propos mingled with couplets
1861: Les Anciens et les nouveaux, one-act à-propos militaire et populaire
1862: La Pupille de la garde, ou Un souvenir d'Italie, one-act à-propos mingled with couplets, with Nantulle
1862: Qui crève les yeux, les paye, one-act comedy, with Ernest Buffault
1863: Paul et Virginie dans une mansarde, one-act vaudeville, with Alfred Séguin
1866: À la salle de police, military sketch in one act, mingled with song

Bibliography 
 Joseph-Marie Quérard, Charles Louandre, La Littérature française contemporaine : XIX, 1854,

References 

19th-century French dramatists and playwrights
Year of birth missing
Year of death missing